The Dee Estuary is a large estuary by means of which the River Dee flows into Liverpool Bay.  The estuary starts near Shotton after a five-mile (8 km) 'canalised' section and the river soon swells to be several miles wide forming the boundary between the Wirral Peninsula in north-west England and Flintshire in north-east Wales. The Dee Estuary's largest towns along it include Hollywell, Flint, Connah's Quay, Shotton, Queensferry, Saltney Ferry, Chester (City), Heswall, West Kirby and Neston as well as other villages and towns alongside it. The A548 also passes along the estuary in Wales and parts of Cheshire West and Chester and Merseyside in England. The North Wales Coast Line follows the course of the Dee Estuary between Prestatyn and Chester.

Geology
The estuary is unusual in that comparatively little water occupies so large a basin. One theory is that larger rivers such as the Severn and/or Mersey once flowed into the Dee. The current view is that the estuary owes its origin to the passage of glacial ice southeastwards from the Irish Sea during successive ice ages, eroding a broad and shallow iceway through the relatively soft Triassic sandstones and Coal Measures mudstones underlying the area. The inner parts of this channel were filled by glacially derived sands and gravels long ago, and infilling by mud and silt has continued since. It is also thought that prior to the ice ages, the estuary received larger river flows as the upper Severn flowed into the Dee near Chirk. For a period, the Mersey may also have flowed into the Dee by means of a channel which it cut through the base of the Wirral Peninsula.

Conservation
The estuary is a major wildlife area and one of the most important estuaries in Britain, amongst the most important in Europe for its populations of waders and wildfowl. The Environment Agency is the Conservation Authority, and the estuary is protected or listed under several schemes:

 Site of Special Scientific Interest (SSSI)
 Special Protection Area (SPA)
 Sensitive Marine Area (SMA)
 Natura 2000 site
 Ramsar site

Large parts of the area are within the RSPB's Dee Estuary Nature Reserve.

Fishery

The estuary supports some important natural fisheries, including salmon and trout on their way to and from the freshwater river, as well as sea-fisheries and shell-fisheries, especially cockles.

Trade and industry
From earliest times, the Dee estuary was a major trading and military route, to and from Chester.  From about the 14th century, Chester provided facilities for trade with Ireland, Spain, and Germany, and seagoing vessels would "lay to" in the Dee awaiting favourable winds and tides.  As the Dee started to silt up, harbouring facilities developed on the Wirral bank at Shotwick, Burton, Neston, Parkgate, Dawpool, and "Hoyle Lake" or Hoylake.  The excavation of the New Cut in 1737, to improve access to Chester, diverted the river's course to the Welsh side of the estuary, but failed to stem the silting up of the river, and Chester's trading function declined as that of Liverpool on the River Mersey grew. However, Chester was still a major port of passenger embarkation for Ireland until the early 19th century.

The Dee Estuary was industrialised from quite early on in the Industrial Revolution, and some industry remains today. Notable among these are Shotton Steel, formerly owned by John Summers & Sons, and now owned by Tata Steel; the gas-fired power station at Connah's Quay; three separate paper mills; a chemical manufacturing plant; and numerous smaller manufacturing industries. The estuary also receives the treated sewage effluent from Queensferry works and from Chester sewage treatment works. At the mouth of the estuary is the natural gas sweetening plant at Point of Ayr on the site of the former colliery. There are also commercial docks at Mostyn although their use is limited by the tide.

Signs of past industry are visible along the whole length of the estuary especially on the Welsh side. Large stretches of what now appear as flood embankments are long abandoned industrial waste heaps, some still containing highly reactive and caustic materials, including large heaps of Galligu, a by-product of the LeBlanc process used at the James Muspratt alkali works at Flint.

The Dee estuary also supported industries concerned with the synthesis of PCBs and some pharmaceuticals and was also home to several industrial waste oil-reclamation industries.

As a consequence of its industrial heritage, there are extensive areas of contaminated ground along the shores of the estuary.

The estuary also plays a part in the most modern of industries as it provides the first stage of transport of Airbus A380 wings on their way to Toulouse via barge to Mostyn docks.

References

External links

Metropolitan Borough of Wirral: Dee Estuary SSSI
Dee Estuary bird life
Joint Nature Conservation Committee (JNCC)
RSPB Dee Estuary website
The Dee Estuary Website

Metropolitan Borough of Wirral
Rivers of Cheshire
Sites of Special Scientific Interest in Cheshire
Coast of Flintshire
Bodies of water of Flintshire
Sites of Special Scientific Interest in Clwyd
Sites of Special Scientific Interest in Flintshire
Estuaries of England
Estuaries of Wales
Ramsar sites in England
Ramsar sites in Wales
Special Protection Areas in Wales
England–Wales border
River Dee, Wales